Thomas Espin  (1767–1822) was an English schoolmaster, mathematician, topographical artist, antiquary and amateur architect, who spent most of his life at Louth in Lincolnshire.

Career
Espin was the son of a farmer and educated at the Free School at Wragby in Lincolnshire. He took up schoolmastering and in 1790 was appointed  to a school at Louth that had been established by Robert Mapletoft. Master of Pembroke College, Cambridge in 1677. He advertised the school as a Mathematical and Architectural, nautical and Commercial Academy. He published  a Practical geometry consisting of definitions and some of the most useful geometrical problems selected for private use.  He was elected a Fellow of the Society of Antiquaries.

Artistic work
Espin was an accomplished watercolour artist. Batholomew Howlett used many engravings of  his work to illustrate his Views in the County of Lincolnshire which was published in 1805

Architectural work

In 1805 he supervised the rebuilding of the belfry windows in the tower of Louth church, and in 1815 he was invited by the Louth town council to submit plans for rebuilding of Louth Town Hall, which was not undertaken. His most notable work was the Gothic revival The Priory in Louth which he started in 1812. He laid out the surrounding parkland with Follies which were constructed from stonework taken from Louth Abbey. In 1818 he started on a summerhouse for himself, which became his mausoleum when he died in 1822.

Further reading
Antram N (revised), Pevsner N & Harris J, (1989), The Buildings of England: Lincolnshire, Yale University Press.
Colvin H. A (1995), Biographical Dictionary of British Architects 1600-1840. Yale University Press, 3rd edition London, pp. 350.
Robinson D and Sturman C.(2001), William Brown and the Louth Panorama, Louth.

External links

References

1767 births
1822 deaths
English antiquarians
Lincolnshire Antiquary
Architects from Lincolnshire
Fellows of the Society of Antiquaries of London